Greywell Tunnel is a disused tunnel on the Basingstoke Canal near Greywell in Hampshire,
which is now a
 biological Site of Special Scientific Interest.

History

Construction of the canal had been authorised by an
Act of Parliament in 1778, and the engineers
John Smeaton, Benjamin Henry Latrobe
and William Jessop were appointed in 1787.
After a survey by Jessop the proposed route of the canal was changed
to include the tunnel, in order to avoid passing around Tylney Hall
whose owner had objected.

The canal construction contract was awarded to John Pinkerton in August 1788,
and construction started in October 1788.

The tunnel construction had been initially subcontracted to
Charles Jones, even though he had been
dismissed by the Thames and Severn Canal company in 1788 after failing
to complete the Sapperton Tunnel project;
in his defence, he had been asked to build it bigger than originally
specified and line it with bricks at no extra cost.
However, Jones was dismissed in 1789 after the quality
of the tunnel work was criticised. Pinkerton had
complained constantly about him.

It is not clear whether Pinkerton then personally supervised the
building of the tunnel, but in 1789 the company also sacked its brickmaker,
and in 1790 required Pinkerton to ensure that the quality of the brick
was adequate for the tunnel work.  of tunnel had
been completed by June 1791, and by November 1792 a similar distance
was left to be completed.

The canal was fully opened in September 1794.
The tunnel had no towpath so boats had
to be taken through by legging, taking up to six
hours to pass through the tunnel.

The last boat passage through the tunnel was made by the narrowboat Basingstoke
over the winter of 1913-1914.
Even before this commercial traffic on the western
part of the canal had mostly ceased, and the tunnel became impassable when
part of it collapsed in 1932.  The inaccessible part of the canal to the west was then sold.
It was still possible for canoeists to get through the tunnel until
the late 1950s,
but the blockage is now total, cutting off Basingstoke from the first section of the Basingstoke Canal.

SSSI
The tunnel is of interest for its bat populations: it has more roosting bats than any other site in Britain. The species involved are Natterer's bat (Myotis nattereri), Daubenton's bat (Myotis daubentoni), the whiskered bat (Myotis mystacinus), Brandt's bat (Myotis brandti) and the brown long-eared bat (Plecotus auritus). It was first studied for its bat populations in 1975, and was listed as an SSSI in December 1985, after a partial count of the population revealed 541 bats in the first  of the eastern end, from which total numbers were estimated to be around 2,000 animals. The blockage, combined with several springs in the tunnel, creates an ideal micro-climate for the bats, which is maintained at around  all year. When the temperature outside the tunnel is colder than this, cold air flows into the bottom of the tunnel where it is warmed by the water, and warmer air flows out along the top of the tunnel. During the summer the air flow is reversed, with warm air flowing into the top of the tunnel and being cooled as it flows back out over the water. By 2006, there were some 12,500 bats roosting in the tunnel, which included the largest known colony of Natterer's bat.

Bibliography

References

1792 establishments in England
Sites of Special Scientific Interest in Hampshire
Basingstoke Canal
Canal tunnels in England
Buildings and structures in Hampshire
Tunnels completed in 1792
Tunnels in Hampshire